Charles Wayne Dicus (born October 2, 1948) is a former American football wide receiver and a member of the College Football Hall of Fame. Dicus played college football at the University of Arkansas and professionally two seasons in the National Football League (NFL) with the San Diego Chargers. He later served as president of the Razorback Foundation, the private organization that raises funds for school athletic endeavors, for 17 years.

College career
Dicus played wide receiver for the Razorbacks from 1968 to 1970, ending his career the top receiver in team history at the time. His totals of 118 catches and 1854 yards still rank as the 8th best career totals for the team.  Arkansas had a 28-5 record in the years he played.

Dicus was selected All-Southwest Conference in each of his three seasons and received 1st team All-America honors from the American Football Coaches Association in his junior year and the AFCA, Associated Press and Walter Camp Foundation after his senior season.

In his junior season, Dicus was chosen Most Valuable Player in the 1969 Sugar Bowl for catching 12 passes for 169 yards and the game's only touchdown. He also played in the 1970 Hula Bowl and the All-American Game after completing his college playing eligibility.

Dicus was inducted into the Razorback Hall of Honor in 1993 and selected a member of the school's All-Century Team in 1994.

Professional career

Dicus's career in the National Football League spanned two seasons with the San Diego Chargers and one season with the Pittsburgh Steelers. His career totals included 24 receptions for 319 yards and 3 touchdowns.

Post-playing career
After ending his professional football career, Dicus joined the staff of Richard Williamson at the University of Memphis, then known as Memphis State University. He also sold real estate in the off-season.

In 1991, Dicus became president of the Razorback Foundation, a position he would hold until his sudden ouster in October 2008.

Dicus was inducted into the Arkansas Sports Hall of Fame in 1995.  He was inducted into the College Football Hall of Fame in 1999.

References

1948 births
Living people
American football wide receivers
Arkansas Razorbacks football players
Memphis Tigers football coaches
San Diego Chargers players
All-American college football players
College Football Hall of Fame inductees
Garland High School alumni
People from Garland, Texas
People from Odessa, Texas
Players of American football from Texas